is the artistic name of Maejima Tadaaki, who was born in Ibaraki Prefecture. He was a sōsaku-hanga artist in 20th Century Japan. During World War II, Maejima Tadaaki was trained as a kamikaze pilot in the Japanese air force, but the war ended before he was assigned a mission. Haku had no formal art training, but studied for two years with the sōsaku-hanga artist Onchi Kōshirō (1891–1955).  

Two unique qualities of Maki Haku prints are the textures achieved by working the designs in wet cement and the use of Kanji (Chinese characters) as design motifs. In 1962, he started adding texture to his prints.  At first, he added texture to the entire sheet after it was printed.  In 1965, he began embossing designs into unprinted paper by using a press to transfer a design created in cement on a carved plywood board, and then adding color with stencils.  He distorted and rearranged the strokes of Chinese characters to produce striking and serene images. For example, Poem 71-91 is a highly stylized representation of the kanji 無, which is pronounced mu and means nothingness, an important concept in some forms of Buddhism.  

Haku participated in the Tokyo International Print Biennale in 1957 and 1960. The book Festive Wine: Ancient Japanese Poems from the Kinkafu is a translation of 21 ancient poems called Kinkafu or Music for Wagon Songs. The translation is accompanied by Maki Haku's prints that were made in 1968–69. 

The Art Institute of Chicago, the Cincinnati Art Museum, the Honolulu Museum of Art, the Los Angeles County Museum of Art, the Museum of Fine Arts, Boston, the Museum of Modern Art (New York), the University of Michigan Museum of Art, and the Philadelphia Museum of Art are among the public collections holding prints by Maki Haku.

Further reading
 Brannen, Noah, Elliott, William and Maki, Haku. Festive Wine: Ancient Japanese Poems from the Kinkafu. New York: Walker/Weatherhill, 1969
 Michener, James A., The Modern Japanese Print: An Appreciation, Tuttle Publishing, Rutland, Vermont, 1968, pp. 51-54 
 Petit, Gaston, 44 Modern Japanese Print Artists, Vol 1, Kodansha International, Tokyo, 1972,  pp. 210-219
 Tretiak, Daniel, The Life and Works of Haku Maki, Outskirts Press, Parker, Colorado, 2007

External links
 Haku-maki.com
 Maki Haku's works at Los Angeles County Museum of Art

Footnotes

Japanese printmakers
1924 births
2000 deaths
Artists from Ibaraki Prefecture
Sosaku hanga artists
20th-century Japanese artists